S80 or S-80 may refer to:

Automobiles 
 Daihatsu Hijet (S80), a kei truck and microvan
 FAW Senya S80, a crossover
 Toyota Crown (S80), a sedan
 Volvo S80, an executive car

Aviation 
 Idaho County Airport, in Grangeville, Idaho, United States
 Short S.80, a British floatplane
 Sikorsky S-80, an American helicopter

Consumer electronics 
 Canon PowerShot S80, a digital camera
 Series 80 (software platform), for mobile phones
 Yamaha S80, an electric piano

Roads 
 County Route S80 (California), United States
 County Route S80 (Bergen County, New Jersey), United States
 S80 Port of Taicang North Port Expressway, China

Submarines 
 
 S-80 Plus-class submarine, of the Spanish Navy

Other uses
 S80, a postcode district for Worksop, England

See also
 Super 80, aircraft of the McDonnell Douglas MD-80 series